Almirante Tamandaré was a protected cruiser of the Brazilian Navy. The Brazilian cruiser with its armament of 6 in guns resembled the British  (completed 1885-1887)  which were among the first protected cruisers. Unlike most major warships in South American navies, Almirante Tamandaré was not ordered from a foreign shipyard but was built at Rio de Janeiro. It was the third largest ship in the Brazilian navy at the time (after the battleships  and ).

The completion of Almirante Tamandare coincided with the Revolta da Armada (revolt of the Navy) which was an 1893-1894 mutiny of most of Brazil's navy related to the country's political disputes. The revolt was unsuccessful, as the naval officers did not have effective support from their allies on land and the government was able to purchase various small or improvised naval vessels overseas to retake control of the coastline.

One contemporary source, writing 25 years after Almirante Tamandares launch, said of the ship that:

References

Bibliography
 

1890 ships
Ships built in Brazil
World War I cruisers of Brazil